Golli (also Romanized as Gollī; also known as Gol and Gollū) is a village in Yurchi-ye Sharqi Rural District, Kuraim District, Nir County, Ardabil Province, Iran. At the 2006 census, its population was 124, in 21 families.

References 

Towns and villages in Nir County